The following lists events that happened during 1975 in the Republic of Korea.

Incumbents
President: Park Chung-hee 
Prime Minister: Kim Jong-pil (until 19 December), Choi Kyu-hah (starting 19 December)

Events

April
 April 9 - Eight people were hanged for being involved with the People's Revolutionary Party Incident.

Births

 17 February - Harisu, pop singer, model and actress
 13 June - Kim Jo-Sun, archer

See also
List of South Korean films of 1975
Years in Japan
Years in North Korea

References

 
South Korea
Years of the 20th century in South Korea
1970s in South Korea
South Korea
South